"Moulin Ru: The Rusical" is the twelfth episode of the fourteenth season of the American reality competition television series RuPaul's Drag Race, which aired on VH1 on March 25, 2022. The episode has contestants perform a Rusical parody-tribute to the film Moulin Rouge! for the main challenge. Andra Day served as guest judge, alongside regular panelists RuPaul, Michelle Visage, and Ross Mathews.

During the challenge, contestants were required to record their own vocals, then dance and lip-sync on the main stage as they portrayed various characters and other aspects of the burlesque. Leland assisted with the vocal recording process; choreography was supervised by Leslie Jordan. Both would appear in the performance portraying Christian and the Duke of Dickington, respectively. Gabe Lopez produced the music. 

The runway theme was "Mirror, Mirror". RuPaul named Lady Camden the winner, while Bosco and Jorgeous placed in the bottom two. After lip-syncing to "Heartbreak Hotel (Hex Hector Remix)" by Whitney Houston, Jorgeous was declared a winner but Bosco was saved from elimination due to "Golden Candy Bar" twist introduced early in the season.

Cast 
 Angeria Paris VanMicheals as Charisma
 Bosco as Saltine
 Daya Betty as Uniqueness
 DeJa Skye as Nerve
 Jorgeous as Talent
 Lady Camden as Mama Z
 Willow Pill as Green Fairy

Results

Lip sync

 The contestant lost the lipsync but was revealed to possess the golden chocolate bar and was saved from elimination.

Soundtrack album

Alongside the airing of the episode, a 12-track soundtrack album was released with the music from the Rusical on the 26th of March.

References

2022 American television episodes
Moulin Rouge!
RuPaul's Drag Race episodes